Amanda Billing (born 12 April 1976 in New Zealand) is a New Zealand actress best known for her role as Doctor Sarah Potts on New Zealand soap opera Shortland Street.

Biography
Billing grew up in Masterton, and spent her university years in Christchurch. After graduating with a Bachelor of Arts with 1st Class Honours in Geography from the University of Canterbury, she trained at the Christchurch College of Education and became a high school teacher.

Billing was involved in drama throughout her teaching years and has acted in a few amateur stage productions including Cloud Nine and The Country Wife. She has worked at several schools throughout Auckland teaching Geography, English and Social Studies, most recently at Rangitoto College.

Credits

Television
Shortland Street - (Sarah Potts) - Core Cast 2004–2014 South Pacific Pictures
Find Me a Māori Bride - (Crystal Leslie) - Main Cast (2015–present)
Newsworthy - (Herself) - Guest Cast (2015)
The Cul de Sac - (Rose's mother) (2015)
The Brokenwood Mysteries - (Brenda White) (2016)
Power Rangers Ninja Steel - (Principal Hastings) (2017–2018)
Kid sister - (Keren) (2022)

Theatre
Dust Pilgrim - Multiple Characters - 2018 - Red Leap Theatre (dir. Julie Nolan)
Boys Will Be Boys - 'Astrid' - 2016 - Silo Theatre (dir. Sophie Roberts)
The Book of Everything - 'Mother' - 2016 - Silo Theatre (dir. Sophie Roberts)
Cabaret - 'Sally Bowles' - 2010 - Auckland Theatre Company (dir. Michael Hurst)
Threepenny Opera - 'Polly Peachum' - 2008 - Silo Theatre and The Large Group (dir. Michael Hurst)
Cloud Nine - 'Edward' (Act I), 'Victoria' (Act II) - 2004 - Silo Theatre (dir. Edwin Wright)
As You Like It - 'Rosalind' - 2003/2004 - Legacy Theatre Co. (dir. Tim Flavell)
Home Ground - 'Margaret' - 2003 - Auckland Performing Arts Centre (dir. Carla Martel)
The Country Wife - 'The Country Wife' - 2003 - Silo Theatre (dir. Heath Jones)

Voice Work
George FM - various - 2002–2003

Other
Auckland based singer (lyric Soprano), dancer

Video game
Path of Exile - 'Oshabi' - 2020

References

External links

1976 births
20th-century New Zealand actresses
21st-century New Zealand actresses
Living people
New Zealand television actresses
New Zealand stage actresses
People from Masterton
University of Canterbury alumni
New Zealand soap opera actresses